The Holy Cross Crusaders men's lacrosse team represents the College of the Holy Cross in National Collegiate Athletic Association (NCAA) Division I college lacrosse. The program was created in 1958. Holy Cross plays its home games at Kuzniewski Field, which has a capacity of 1,000. The Crusaders have competed in the Patriot League since its 1991 founding. Through 2020, the team has an all–time record of 268–539–1.

The team's most successful period in the modern era occurred in the 1980s under head coach Bob Lindsay. Helmed by Lindsay, the Crusaders won 12 games in three seasons, while capturing all three of their conference championships as a member of the Colonial League. In Lindsay's 9 years, Holy Cross suffered only two losing seasons. The Crusaders would not have another non-losing season until 2019, in which they finished 77, before their first winning season in 32 years in 2020. Shortly after Lindsay's departure in 1990, Holy Cross joined their all-sports conference home, the Patriot League, completing their first season with Ed Carver as head coach.

Long an underachieving program, the Crusaders have seen an uptick in their performance in recent years. In 2015, the team won its only two victories over ranked foes, downing #8 Loyola in Baltimore before defeating the #9 Army Black Knights men's lacrosse for the first time in program history. Both wins came by just a single goal in dramatic fashion. Under head coaches Judd Lattimore and Peter Burke, Holy Cross made the Patriot League tournament for the first three times in program history in the span of 2016 to 2019. While falling short of their first appearance in the NCAA Division I Men's Lacrosse Championship, the Crusaders scored their first postseason victory with an upset 11–7 quarterfinal victory over the 3-seeded Navy Midshipmen in 2017, before falling to Loyola in the Patriot semifinals. Furthermore, in 2020 sophomore Chris Conlin earned honorable mention recognition as a Division I All-American, the first Crusader to earn such national acclaim since 1964 and only 7th nomination all-time for the program.

Season results
The following is a list of Holy Cross’s results by season since the institution of NCAA Division I in 1971:

{| class="wikitable"

|- align="center"

†NCAA canceled 2020 collegiate activities due to the COVID-19 virus.
Jim Morrissey took over the head coaching position on the 7th game of the 2011 season. Adam Pascal's 0–6 (0–1) mark from that season has been credited to his overall record, while Jim Morrissey’s 2–7 (1–4) mark has been credited to his overall record.
 Justin Hager coached the final game of the 2014 season, going 0–1 (0–0).

References

External links
Official website

College men's lacrosse teams in the United States
Patriot League men's lacrosse
1971 establishments in Massachusetts
Sports clubs established in 1971